Portsmouth is a village on the A646 road in the Calderdale district, in the county of West Yorkshire, England. Nearby settlements include the towns of Burnley and Todmorden and the village of Cornholme.

History

Though it was historically part of Lancashire, the many boundary changes in the area have resulted in the village now being part of Calderdale, West Yorkshire. In the 19th century it was in Cliviger township, Whalley parish, and the border to Yorkshire ran east of the place. For electoral purposes, Portsmouth was counted as part of parliamentary constituencies of Lancashire until 1917, and of the West Riding of Yorkshire from 1918.

The village had a railway station, which was opened in 1849 by the Manchester and Leeds Railway.

References

 A-Z West Yorkshire (page 92)
 Wikimapia

External links

Villages in West Yorkshire
Todmorden